Mercedes Homes was a home building company headquartered in Melbourne, Florida, USA.  Mercedes Homes was founded in 1983 and built new homes and communities throughout Florida, Texas, North Carolina, and South Carolina. It has since built homes for over 40,000 families. In 2007, Mercedes Homes was ranked #30 on the 2007 BUILDER 100 with 2,357 closings (down 45% from 2006) and $724 million in revenue (down 44% from 2006).

Corporate history
Mercedes Homes was established in 1983 by Howard Buescher, a veteran of the homebuilding business, and his daughter Susan Girard. He named the new company after his wife, Mercedes. Howard's other children  followed him into the business and in 2009, five of them had executive positions in the company.

As of January 13, 2012 Mercedes Homes has closed their building division, the company has issued a statement that they intend to complete all homes currently under construction and finalize all active sales, but no new projects will be started. Mercedes Homes has also stated they are exploring options to complete unfinished developments, that may include, soliciting a new builder, completing the projects under another LLC/Division or selling the development rights.

Key executives
The key executives are:

Keith H. Buescher, President
Howard Buescher, Founder and Chairman
Susan Girard, Co-Founder
Scott Buescher, Chief Operating Officer
Linda Swain, Regional President

Divisions 

Mercedes homes had three divisions:

 Florida (Daytona, Ft. Myers, Jacksonville, Melbourne, Ocala, Orlando, Port St. Lucie, Tampa, Palm Bay)
 Texas (Austin, Dallas, Houston, San Antonio)
 Carolinas (Charlotte)

Corporate structure 

Mortgage Brokering and Lending Services: Cornerstone Home Mortgage Corp (dba MHI Mortgage) provides mortgage brokerage and lending services to customers.
Title and Closing Services: BDR Title Corporation and BDR Title Corporation of Texas, Inc. provide a full range of closing and title services to customers in the states of Florida and Texas, including the issuance of title insurance policies in connection with the sale of homes constructed by Mercedes Homes.
Manufacture and Supply of Construction Components: Space Coast Truss, Inc., and Solid Wall Systems, Inc. manufacture and supply components for use in the construction of homes, including roof and floor trusses and concrete walls, to Mercedes Homes and to unrelated homebuilders.
Real Estate Services: Mercedes Homes Realty, Inc (dba MHI Realty) and Our House Realty, Inc. provide Mercedes Homes’ customers with real estate sales services in the states of Florida and Texas.
Insurance: Preferred Home Insurance, Inc. provides MHI customers with homeowners’ insurance policies.
Other Operations: There are other operations not directly involving the marketing, sale or construction of single family homes. Suntree Office Complex, LLC is responsible for leasing of corporate headquarters offices in Melbourne, Florida. Dairy Towns Community Developers, Inc. has purchased land for sale and development by MHI. Additionally, the Mercedes Homes and some of its subsidiaries are parties to numerous joint ventures that own and develop residential communities.

Bankruptcy 
Mercedes Homes filed for Chapter 11 bankruptcy protection in the United States District Court for the Southern District of Florida on January 26, 2009. The home builder listed between 5,001 and 10,000 creditors, and assets between $100,001 and $500,000. Fifth Third Bank, which was owed $7.1 million, was listed as the largest unsecured creditor. 84 Lumber was owed about $615,000, and Deal Air Electrical Services is owed about $563,000.

In a statement released after bankruptcy, the home builder stated that it expected to “move quickly through the reorganization process and to emerge from its reorganization proceedings better capitalized and financially stronger.” It also stated that it had "suffered from the prolonged weakness in the economies of the markets" where it does business and has suffered additional "liquidity strains" after one of its lenders was taken over by the Federal Deposit Insurance Corp.

The Mercedes Homes’ Reorganization FAQ provided some information about the impact of the bankruptcy on deposits, warranties and title:

Customer Deposits: Mercedes Homes stated that it would place any deposits received after the filing in an escrow account with a company that is not part of the reorganization filing to ensure customer deposits do not become involved in the bankruptcy. As for deposits received before the bankruptcy filing, the home builder stated that it would be seeking court authority to maintain customer deposits under existing procedures and refund customer deposits if warranted by the terms of the Home Purchase Agreement, consistent with its normal business practices.
Home Warranty: Mercedes Homes stated that it has contracted with a third party to provide home warranties to new home buyers, and that it would be seeking court approval to honor some warranties that were made before the filing. On October 30, 2009, the court authorized Mercedes Homes to continue to honor obligations related to Customer Programs, including warranty claims. The builder would have authorization to honor home warranties, but it would not be obligated to do so. A limitation exists in relation to this authorization: Mercedes Homes would not be able to spend more than 1% of a home's final sale price on warranty claims.
Home Title: Mercedes Homes stated that BDR Title, responsible for clearing titles of homes, though a subsidiary of Mercedes Homes, was not included in the reorganization filing.

References

External links
MercedesHomes.com in Internet Archive

Companies based in Brevard County, Florida
Melbourne, Florida
Home builders
Construction and civil engineering companies of the United States
Construction and civil engineering companies established in 1983
Companies disestablished in 2012
Companies that filed for Chapter 11 bankruptcy in 2009
Defunct companies based in Florida
1983 establishments in Florida
2012 disestablishments in Florida